Aselsan (acronym: Askeri Elektronik Sanayi, Military Electronic Industries), Aselsan A.Ş., is a Turkish defense corporation headquartered in Ankara, Turkey. Its main operating area is research, development and manufacture of advanced military products for air, land and maritime forces. The company is one of the major contractors of Turkish Armed Forces. Aselsan was ranked by Defense News as 48th largest defense company in terms of revenue. Turkish Army Foundation is the founder and major stockholder.

History 
Aselsan was founded by the Turkish Army Foundation in 1975 after US's decision to put an embargo on Turkey due to Cyprus Operation. The first CEO of ASELSAN was M. Hacim Kamoy.

In early 1979, following an investment (for example, card payment systems), and infrastructure establishment period, ASELSAN started its production, at Macunköy facilities in Ankara. Since then, ASELSAN has expanded its product and customer portfolio, mostly based on indigenous research and development, locally trained personnel, and in cooperation with other Turkish research institutions and universities.

Organization 
ASELSAN designs, develops and manufactures modern electronic systems for military and industrial customers in Turkey and abroad. The company headquarters is located at Macunköy facilities in Ankara, Turkey. According to the field of activities, ASELSAN has been organized in five business sectors:

 Communication and Information Technologies Business Sector (HBT),
 Microelectronics, Guidance and Electro-Optics Business Sector (MGEO),
 Radar and Electronic Warfare Systems Business Sector (REHIS),
 Defense Systems Technologies Business Sector (SST),
 Transportation, Security, Energy and Automation Systems Business Sector (UGES).

The HBT, REHIS, SST and UGES sectors have high-technology and automated infrastructure in engineering and production at Macunköy facilities. Electronic production includes surface mount technology, multilayer and flexible printed circuit boards, mechanical and mould productions, system integration and test fields. While the HBT sector's main product spectrum covers military and professional communications systems, REHIS sector's main operations are focused on radar, electronic warfare and SST sector's main operations are focused on command-control systems. The MGEO sector manufactures hybrid microelectronic circuits, night-vision devices, thermal cameras, laser ranger/designators and inertial navigation systems at Akyurt facilities.

In all business sectors, methodologies complying with military standards and ISO 9001 are  applied using computer-aided design (CAD), computer-aided engineering (CAE) and computer-aided manufacturing (CAM) technologies.

ASELSAN is a member of TÜMAKÜDER and IPC.

Facilities

Radar and Electronic Warfare Technology Center 
ASELSAN opened its new facility in Gölbaşı district of Ankara on 16 March 2015. Built in three years at a cost of US$157 million, the site serves for the production of radar and electronic warfare equipment required by the Turkish Armed Forces (Army, Navy, Air Force), space and unmanned platforms. A total of 776 engineers, 261 technical personnel and more than 200 support personnel are employed in the center.

The technology center serves for the design, research and development, production, test and logistic support of primarily long-range tracking air defense and fighter aircraft radar systems, as well as other radar and electronic warfare systems and antennas, microwave power modules and software.

International expansion 
ASELSAN has associated companies in Azerbaijan, Kazakhstan, Saudi Arabia, and United Arab Emirates. Besides, the company announced in October 2015 that they are planning to expand their South African business "by seeking partnerships to form a private company out of its local branch ASELSAN South Africa"

Aselsan Baku 
Aselsan Baku was founded on 11 February 1998 by Aselsan in Azerbaijan. It currently produces civil and military hand-held radios in Azerbaijan. The capital of the company was fully invested by Aselsan. The company, which will operate in the fields of sales, maintenance-repair and production and whose founding capital is determined as USD 500 thousand, has been the first company established by Aselsan abroad.

The laser guidance kit produced by Aselsan in 2018 was integrated into the ammunition developed by Azerbaijan.

Aselsan Ukraine 
Aselsan Ukraine was established on 1 September 2020 by Aselsan in Ukraine.

Aselsan Middle East 
Aselsan Middle East was established on 19 July 2012 by Aselsan in Jordan.

Products 
Aselsan is present in many areas, especially in defense industry product supply and research and development activities.

ALBATROS-T unmanned surface vehicles
ALBATROS K unmanned surface vehicles
Amphibious landing ship project (LST)
ARI 1-T rotary wing miniature UAV.
AYAC military routing and switching device
Biometric integrity verification and access control systems (BKDGKS)
Comparison of communication solutions
EIRS
Field telephone
Fixed central radio peripherals and accessories
GOKDENIZ close-in weapon system
GRC-5220 tactical broadband ethernet radio family
Hisar missiles
Integrated marine communication systems
IP remote control system
KALKAN air defence radar
KAPLAN unmanned ground vehicle family
KORKUT 35 mm self-propelled anti-aircraft gun (SPAAG)
KORAL electronic warfare system
LEVENT unmanned surface vehicle
Logistics support vessels (LDG)
MİLGEM combat system procurement project
MIUS/MUAS miniature UAV
Military G.SHDSL modems
Mobile receiver-transmitter and repeater radio equipment – MATE
 Mortar fire management system
 Multi purpose amphibious assault ship (LHD)
 Mobile air traffic control tower
 Tactical fire direction system
 Portable radio peripherals and accessories
 POYRAZ ammunition transfer system (MTS)
PRC V / UHF software-defined handheld radios
Remote controlled weapon stations including Aselsan SMASH, Aselsan STOP, Aselsan STAMP, Aselsan STAMP-2, Aselsan STAMP-G
 Repeater radio and mobile repeater radio accessories
 SAPAN programmable active / reactive electronic mixing system
Serçe miniature UAV
TASMUS tactical field communication system
 TURKUAZ seismic research ship scientific mission system
 Vehicle radio peripherals and accessories
 VRC-9661 in-vehicle remote control system
 UKAP unmanned ground vehicle
 ZAMBAK helmet Set Units
ZARGANA torpedo countermeasure system for submarines

See also
Defense industry of Turkey

References

External links 
 
 
 ASELSAN Middle East 

Companies listed on the Istanbul Stock Exchange
Electronics companies established in 1975
Engineering companies of Turkey
Defence companies of Turkey
Turkish companies established in 1975
Government-owned companies of Turkey
Electronics companies of Turkey
Turkish brands
Space program of Turkey
Radar manufacturers
Avionics companies
 
Unmanned aerial vehicle manufacturers of Turkey
1975 establishments in Turkey